The 1970 Lamar Tech Cardinals football team represented Lamar State College of Technology—now known as Lamar University—as a member of the Southland Conference during the 1970 NCAA College Division football season. Led by eighth-year head coach Vernon Glass, the Cardinals compiled an overall record of 3–7 with a mark of 1–3 in conference play, placing fourth in the Southland. Lamar Tech played home games at Cardinal Stadium in Beaumont, Texas.

Schedule

References

Lamar
Lamar Cardinals football seasons
Lamar Cardinals Tech football